Christian Mikolajczak (born 15 May 1981) is a German former professional footballer who played as a midfielder.

Honours
 DFB-Pokal: 2000–01
 Bundesliga runner-up: 2000–01

References

External links
 
 

1981 births
Living people
German footballers
Association football midfielders
Germany youth international footballers
Germany under-21 international footballers
Bundesliga players
2. Bundesliga players
3. Liga players
FC Kray players
FC Schalke 04 players
Hannover 96 players
Rot Weiss Ahlen players
FC Erzgebirge Aue players
Holstein Kiel players
FSV Frankfurt players
Dynamo Dresden players
SV Elversberg players
SSVg Velbert players
Footballers from Essen